Elizabeth Marvel (born November 27, 1969) is an American actress. Her more prominent roles include Det. Nancy Parras on The District, Solicitor General Heather Dunbar on House of Cards, and President Elizabeth Keane on Homeland. Film roles include Burn After Reading; Synecdoche, New York; True Grit; Lincoln (alongside husband Bill Camp); and The Meyerowitz Stories. She also had a recurring role in season 2 of the FX series Fargo and the Netflix miniseries Unbelievable.

Early life and education
Marvel was born in Los Angeles, California, and was raised in Mohnton, Pennsylvania. She trained at the Interlochen Arts Academy, and then the Juilliard School.

Career
Since the early 1990s she has appeared in off-Broadway plays.

Marvel appeared in many stage productions throughout her career. Her first professional role was as Isabella in Measure for Measure at Canada's Stratford Festival in 1992. She has won Obie Awards for her work in Thérèse Raquin and Misalliance (1998), A Streetcar Named Desire (2000) and Hedda Gabler (2005). She returned to the role she originated Off-Broadway of Brooke Wyeth in Other Desert Cities, which was played by Rachel Griffiths in its Broadway premiere. In 2009, for her performance in Fifty Words, she was nominated for a Drama Desk Award for Outstanding Actress in a Play.

Marvel first gained widespread attention on television, with her four seasons playing the regular role of Nancy Parras in the CBS series The District (2000–04). She played a variety of guest and recurring roles on Lights Out, Law & Order: Special Victims Unit, Nurse Jackie, Person of Interest, 30 Rock, The Good Wife, and The Newsroom.

In film, Marvel has appeared in Burn After Reading (2008), directed by the Coen brothers, and in True Grit (2010), as the adult Mattie Ross. She appeared in The Bourne Legacy (2012), Lincoln (2012), and Hyde Park on Hudson (2012).

In 2009 she played Louisa May Alcott in scenes from the writer's life in the documentary profile "Louisa May Alcott: The Woman Behind 'Little Women'" that aired on the PBS series America Masters.

In 2013, she was cast as lead in the CW family drama pilot Blink, opposite John Benjamin Hickey. She most recently was noted for portraying Heather Dunbar in Netflix's political drama House of Cards. In 2016, she was cast as President-elect Elizabeth Keane for the sixth and seventh seasons of Showtime drama series Homeland.

Personal life
Marvel married actor Bill Camp on September 4, 2004. The couple have one child, a son named Silas, born in 2007. Marvel revealed on Live with Kelly and Ryan on October 16, 2020 that she has been living with her family on a farm in Vermont.

Theater

Filmography

Film

Television

References

External links
 
 
 

1969 births
Living people
Actresses from Los Angeles
Actresses from Pennsylvania
American film actresses
American stage actresses
American television actresses
Juilliard School alumni
People from Berks County, Pennsylvania
Obie Award recipients
20th-century American actresses
21st-century American actresses